WIUS (88.3 FM) is a radio station licensed to Western Illinois University, the station serves the Macomb, Illinois area. The station is currently owned by Western Illinois University. The station airs select home basketball, softball, volleyball, and football games.

References

External links
 

IUS
IUS
Western Illinois University
Radio stations established in 1981